Betty McDowall (1924 – 1993) was an Australian stage, film and television actress. She was born in Sydney, New South Wales in 1924.

Her television appearances include episodes of Z-Cars, The Saint and The Prisoner.

On stage, she appeared in the West End premiere of Tennessee Williams' play Period of Adjustment at Wyndham's Theatre in 1962.

On the radio, she played Laura Archer in BBC Radio 4's long running soap The Archers.

Filmography

References

External links

1924 births
1993 deaths
Actresses from Sydney
Australian stage actresses
Australian film actresses
Australian television actresses
20th-century Australian actresses